Samuel Forrest (born 1977 in York, England) is an English singer-songwriter, best known as the frontman of Nine Black Alps. He also co-fronts The Sorry Kisses with Hayley Hutchinson and previously played bass in York group The Halcyon Band.

Forrest has released six solo albums, Down the Hillside, Paper Crown, No Imagination, The Edge Of Nowhere, Population 4000 and Candlelightwater  on Desert Mine Music.

In 2016, Forrest formed a new band called Sewage Farm with bass player Danny Trew Barton and drummer Danny Hirst. The band released their debut album, Cloudy, on Desert Mine Music in November 2016.

Discography
Down the Hillside (2008)
Paper Crown (2009)
No Imagination (2010)
The Edge Of Nowhere (2012)
Population 4000 (2013)
Candlelightwater (2015)

References

External links

1977 births
Living people
21st-century British guitarists
21st-century British male singers
21st-century English singers
English male guitarists
English male singers
English rock guitarists
English songwriters
Musicians from York
British male songwriters